House of David may refer to:

Davidic line, or House of David, the lineage of King David through the texts in the Hebrew Bible, in the New Testament, and through the succeeding centuries
House of David (commune), a religious society in Benton Harbor, Michigan, U.S.
House of David (album) by David Newman, 1967
 House of David, a 2015 album by Lea DeLaria
House of David, a recording studio owned by David Briggs
House of David, a 1930s–1940s exhibition basketball team of Dempsey Hovland
Cuban House of David, a baseball team 1931–1932

See also

 David, the third king of the United Monarchy of Israel and Judah
 Tel Dan stele, an ancient stone with an inscription mentioning House of David